Parliamentary elections were held in France on 24 May and 1 June 1869, with a second round on 6 and 7 June. These elections resulted in a victory for the regime of the Second Empire, but the opposition strengthened its presence in the legislature. Nationwide, the regime won 55% of the vote. In Paris, the opposition parties (mostly Republicans) won 75% of the vote; however, the regime won large majorities in the countryside.

Results

Aftermath
On the nights of 8–9 June 1869, the worst rioting in fifteen years, "the 'white overalls' riots", erupted in several cities throughout France. In Paris, on 8 June, demonstrators assembled on the Boulevard Montmartre and sang the "Marseillaise" (banned under the Second Empire until the Franco-Prussian War); but that was over in an hour. In Belleville the crowd destroyed gas street lamps and shop fronts before marching down the Boulevard du Temple, where they attacked a police van, on their way to the Place de la Bastille, where thirteen people were arrested before order was restored at 2 a.m. by the sergents-de-ville (uniformed police). Many said that the police overreacted to the natural exuberance of the crowd at the favorable showing of liberal candidates in the election, and that the further disturbances on the 9th were in consequence. The crowds reached as far as the Place du Carrousel on at least one night, disrupting a gala soirée at the Tuileries Palace, although the emperor remained impassive in the face of a stream of telegrams and Émile Waldteufel's baton was steady. On the 10th, the Prefect of Police issued a proclamation saying that such disturbances would no longer be tolerated. Cavalry and infantry units were brought in to patrol the streets. A total of 1,100 people were arrested and confined for a time in Bicêtre fortress.

Similar disturbances took place on 8 June in Bordeaux and Arles, and on 9 June in Nantes.

References

Legislative elections in France
France
Legislative
France
France